Bradley William Soderberg (born May 10, 1962) is a men's college basketball coach. He is currently the Director of Scouting for the University of Virginia Cavaliers. Soderberg was previously head coach at Lindenwood, St. Louis, South Dakota State, Loras College, and was the interim head coach at Wisconsin.

Playing career
Born in Wausau, Wisconsin, Soderberg played basketball at Pacelli High School in Stevens Point, Wisconsin for his father, Wisconsin Basketball Coaches Hall of Fame Coach, Don Soderberg. Soderberg played basketball in college at Ripon College from 1980 to 1982 before he transferred to University of Wisconsin–Stevens Point, playing at Stevens Point from 1982 to 1984 under head coach Dick Bennett, and with Terry Porter (who later became player and eventually a head coach in the National Basketball Association).  The 1984 team made it all the way to the championship game of the NAIA Tournament before falling 50–48 to Fort Hays State University. He graduated from the University of Wisconsin–Stevens Point in 1985 with a degree in physical education.

Coaching career

Loras and South Dakota State
In 1986 Soderberg received his master's degree from Colorado State University in physical education. He was then hired as an assistant coach at Fort Hays State University for one season and quickly moved on to an assistant post at Loras College in Dubuque, Iowa. He became head coach of Loras in 1988 and served until 1993 compiling a record of 79–45. He was then hired as head coach of South Dakota State University where he stayed from 1993 to 1995 compiling a record of 36–18.

Wisconsin
After the two successful stints as a head coach at Division II schools, Soderberg's former coach, Dick Bennett, hired him as his assistant at the University of Wisconsin–Madison. He served as an assistant to Bennett through the 2000 season. Three games into the 2000–01 campaign, the Badgers (coming off a Final Four appearance in 2000) saw their head coach, Dick Bennett retire. Soderberg took over the heralded team and led them to a 16–10 record, but the team lost in the first round of the NCAA tournament to Georgia State University, considered a major disappointment to many Badger fans. Soderberg was then let go from his head coach position at the end of the season, as the Badgers hired Bo Ryan.

Saint Louis
Soderberg accepted an assistant post at Saint Louis University under head coach Lorenzo Romar. After his first season Romar was hired away to become the head coach at the University of Washington. Brad Soderberg was promoted to head coach for the 2002–03 season. His first two seasons he led the Billikens to two NIT Tournament appearances.  After his first three years SLU moved from Conference USA to the Atlantic 10.  Soderberg was let go after three consecutive seasons without reaching the post season.  He did however have a 20 win season during his final year at Saint Louis University.  He was replaced by Rick Majerus.

On April 17, 2007 St. Louis sports station KFNS announced that Soderberg had been dismissed as men's basketball coach. No longer a head coach at a college, Soderberg coached his younger son's 4th grade team at St. Cletus in St. Charles, Missouri. On July 7, 2008, Soderberg was named Interim Director of Athletics at Loras College.

Lindenwood
On May 14, 2009, Soderberg was named head coach of Lindenwood University in Saint Charles, Missouri. In his first season as head coach of the Lions, Soderberg led the Lions to one of the best seasons in school history, a record of 23–10, and set a school record for most home wins in a season, going 13–1 at home. On March 29, 2010, the university announced the transfer of Kramer Soderberg, Missouri player of the year during his senior year of high school, from Miami University (Ohio) to join his father's program.

In his second season as head coach of the Lions, Lindenwood set a new school record for most straight wins after Defeating Missouri Valley 77–66 for the team's 12th straight win on January 6, 2011. The Lions finished the regular season 26–4 won the 2011 HAAC Regular Season Championship and earned an automatic bid to the 2011 NAIA Division I men's basketball tournament. The 26 wins set a new best record in school history. Soderberg led the Lions to their first NAIA Division I Tournament win when the 20th seeded Lions defeated 14th-seeded St. Catharine College 78–72. Lindenwood's defense held St. Catharine ten points below its season average and forced 13 turnovers in the game. Offensively, Lindenwood made 33 of 40 free throws. All three of Lindenwoods guards finished with double digit points, Kramer Soderberg finished with 27, Bazzell with 14 points, and Rose with 13. Soderberg's Lions eventually fell in the second round to 3rd-seeded Mountain State University, ending Lindenwood's final season in the NAIA and Heart of America Athletic Conference with the best record in school history with a 29–6 overall record.

In 2011, Lindenwood began the transition from the NAIA to the NCAA's Division II.  Competing as an independent, Lindenwood finished the season with a 26–3 record and was invited to the NCAA's Division II Transitional Tournament in Spearfish, South Dakota.  Soderberg led them to the Division II Transitional National champions by defeating Minot State and Sioux Falls to end the season with a final 28–3 record.

Lindenwood announced their entry into the Mid–America Intercollegiate Athletics Association (MIAA). Although ineligible for post-season play during the transition to Division II, Soderberg's Lions finished their first regular season in the MIAA in a third place tie in the fifteen team league.

Virginia
On April 17, 2015, Soderberg was named an assistant coach at Virginia, serving under Dick Bennett's son and former Wisconsin assistant, Tony Bennett. Soderberg had a job change in the spring of 2021, where he became the Director of Scouting instead of an Assistant Coach under Tony Bennett.

Family
Soderberg and his wife, Linda, have a daughter, Daley, and two sons, Kramer and Davis. Kramer Soderberg was hired as the men's head basketball coach at Millikin University in 2021, having served as an assistant men's coach at Millikin beginning in 2015.

Head coaching record

References

External links
 Virginia profile
 Lindenwood profile

1962 births
Living people
American men's basketball coaches
American men's basketball players
Basketball coaches from Wisconsin
Basketball players from Wisconsin
College men's basketball head coaches in the United States
Colorado State University alumni
Fort Hays State Tigers men's basketball coaches
Guards (basketball)
Lindenwood Lions men's basketball coaches
Loras Duhawks men's basketball coaches
Sportspeople from Wausau, Wisconsin
Saint Louis Billikens men's basketball coaches
South Dakota State Jackrabbits men's basketball coaches
Virginia Cavaliers men's basketball coaches
Wisconsin Badgers men's basketball coaches
Wisconsin–Stevens Point Pointers men's basketball coaches
Wisconsin–Stevens Point Pointers men's basketball players